Cavendish School may refer to:
Cavendish School (Eastbourne)
Cavendish School (Hemel Hempstead)